Vännäs is a locality in Västerbotten County in northern Sweden. Vännäs is the seat of Vännäs Municipality and had 4,466 inhabitants in 2018.

The name of the village is known since 1535 (Wendenäs, ‘The place where a person walking down the western shoreline of the Vindel river must change her path’).

Vännäs is the hometown of the hardcore-band Refused. The Vännäs TV Tower, a 323 metres tall partially staffed broadcasting mast, is located in the vicinity of Vännäs.

Twinned municipalities

Vännäs Municipality is twinned with Cameri, Italy (since 2003), Hemnes, Norway and Storkyro, Finland.

Vännäsdagarna 
Vännäsdagarna ("The Vännäs Days") is a three days long annual festival during the second weekend of July, which brings a mix of performers and street vendors to Vännäs every year. An estimated 58,000 visitors attend the festival each year, thus making Vännäsdagarna the biggest festival in Västerbotten County.

Railway 
The Main Line Through Upper Norrland was built during the 19th century, and was for military reasons passing through Vännäs instead of Umeå, the largest urban center in Västerbotten. The railway made Vännäs an important rail junction, which facilitated the rapid growth of the locality.

Schools 
Liljaskolan, the locality's only upper secondary school caters for 1100 students, studying at eleven programmes. Students at Liljaskolan can choose to study, among other things, transportation and tourism.

Hammarskolan caters for some 250 pupils in year 7–9, whereas younger students attend Vegaskolan which caters for year 0-9.

Notable people from Vännäs

Athletes 
Daniel Tjärnqvist
Mathias Tjärnqvist

Musicians 
Dennis Lyxzén

Media 
Sverker Olofsson
Linda Olofsson

Authors 
Pär Hansson

References

External links 
Vännäs Municipality
Vännäsdagarna

Populated places in Västerbotten County
Populated places in Vännäs Municipality
Municipal seats of Västerbotten County
Swedish municipal seats